The Garibaldi biscuit consists of currants squashed and sandwiched between two thin oblongs of biscuit dough before baking. The biscuits are similar to Eccles cake as well as the Golden Raisin Biscuits once made by Sunshine Biscuits.

Popular with British consumers as a snack for over 150 years, the Garibaldi biscuit is conventionally consumed with tea or coffee, into which it may be dunked in informal social settings. The biscuits also exist under different names in other countries, including Australia (with the name: "Full O'Fruit") and New Zealand (with the name: "Fruitli Golden Fruit").

Appearance
When bought in supermarkets in the UK (under several brands, all very similar), Garibaldi biscuits usually come in four strips of five biscuits each. They have a golden brown, glazed exterior and a moderately sweet pastry, but their defining characteristic is the layer of squashed fruit which gives rise to the colloquial names fly sandwiches, flies' graveyards, dead fly biscuits, or squashed fly biscuits, because the squashed fruit resemble squashed flies.

History
The Garibaldi biscuit was named after Giuseppe Garibaldi, an Italian general and leader of the struggle to unify the Kingdom of Italy.  Garibaldi made a popular visit to South Shields in England in 1854. The biscuit was first manufactured by the Bermondsey biscuit company Peek Freans in 1861 following the recruitment of Jonathan Carr, one of the great biscuit makers of Carlisle. In the United States, the Sunshine Biscuit Company for many years made a popular version of the Garibaldi with raisins which it called "Golden Fruit". Sunshine was bought out by the Keebler Company which briefly expanded the line to include versions filled with other fruits. The entire Golden Fruit product line was discontinued when the Keebler company became a division of Kellogg's in 2001.

Varieties covered with plain or milk chocolate have also been marketed in the past, but appear not to have been available for many years.

See also
Flies' graveyard

References

Giuseppe Garibaldi
Biscuits
1861 introductions